Walter Coles (born 11 February 1928) is an English cricketer. He played two first-class matches for Cambridge University Cricket Club in 1949.

See also
 List of Cambridge University Cricket Club players

References

External links
 

1928 births
Living people
English cricketers
Cambridge University cricketers
People from Northwood, London